Dana Albert Larsen (born 1971) is a Canadian author, businessman, philanthropist and activist for cannabis and drug policy reform. Larsen currently operates businesses and non-profit societies in Vancouver including The Medicinal Cannabis Dispensary, The Medicinal Mushroom Dispensary, The Coca Leaf Cafe, Pothead Books, and the Get Your Drugs Tested centre.

Businesses and non-profits 
In 2006, Larsen co-founded the Vancouver Seed Bank, a business which sold many seed varieties from their storefront and also across Canada by mail-order, including those for banned and controversial psychoactive plants such as marijuana, poppies, peyote and coca.

In November 2008, Larsen announced the opening of The Medicinal Cannabis Dispensary, located almost next door to the Vancouver Seed Bank, on East Hastings Street in Vancouver. The cannabis dispensary is operated by a non-profit society of which Larsen is a Director. In July 2010, the cannabis dispensary opened a second location, in Vancouver's West End.

In June 2019, Larsen closed the Hastings location of the dispensary due to a court order after a long legal battle with the city. In October 2019, the West End dispensary location was raided by the BC "Community Safety Unit" who confiscated all the cannabis in the shop. The dispensary location re-opened three hours later.

In May 2019, Larsen opened a community service called Get Your Drugs Tested, offering free analysis of any street drug using a FTIR spectrometer, fentanyl test strips and other tools. Larsen moved the service into the empty dispensary location on Hastings a few weeks after it had been forced to close. In February 2021, Larsen announced they had analyzed 10,000 samples so far.

In June 2019, Larsen announced the opening of The Medicinal Mushroom DIspensary online, providing microdoses of psilocybe mushrooms for medical purposes across Canada by mail. A Vancouver city councillor cited concerns about people injecting mushrooms and the involvement of drug gangs, and introduced a motion to ban mushroom dispensaries in Vancouver. The motion was defeated.

In October 2020, Larsen opened The Coca Leaf Cafe in Vancouver, with a focus on coca tea drinks made with imported Peruvian coca leaf. The location also sells herbs and plants including peyote, kratom, san pedro and psychedelic microdoses. In February 2021, Larsen added The Medicinal Mushroom Dispensary storefront into the cafe.

Political parties and candidacies 
Larsen was a founding member of both the Marijuana Party of Canada and the BC Marijuana Party. In the 2000 Canadian federal election, Larsen ran as the Marijuana Party candidate for the riding of West Vancouver-Sunshine Coast, receiving 3% of the vote. In the 2001 British Columbia provincial election, Larsen ran as a BC Marijuana Party candidate in the Powell River-Sunshine Coast riding, receiving 3.5% of the vote.

After the 2001 election, Larsen became the Leader of the BC Marijuana Party. In 2003, Larsen resigned from both Marijuana parties and joined Canada's New Democratic Party.

In 2005, Larsen founded a group called "End Prohibition: NDP Against the Drug War." Larsen has since claimed that End Prohibition was instrumental in passing progressive drug-policy resolutions through the provincial NDP in British Columbia, Saskatchewan and Ontario.

Larsen was the federal New Democratic Party candidate for the riding of West Vancouver—Sunshine Coast—Sea to Sky Country for the 2008 federal election. However, he resigned on September 17, after videos he had filmed for Pot-TV in 1999 were released to the media, which showed him taking LSD and smoking marijuana.

On December 29, 2010, Larsen announced his candidacy for the leadership of the British Columbia NDP, running against Adrian DIx, John Horgan, Mike Farnworth and Nicholas Simons. Larsen came in fourth, with 2.7% of the vote.

Sensible BC campaign 
In September 2012, Larsen launched the Sensible BC campaign to decriminalize cannabis possession in BC through a ballot initiative petition. Larsen toured the province extensively before launching the campaign, at one point visiting 32 towns in 12 days. The campaign featured a decorated "Cannabus" which toured the province,

In 2013, Sensible BC had about 4000 volunteers gather over 202,000 signatures from all across the province in 90 days, from September 9 to December 9.  Although not enough signatures were gathered to qualify for a referendum, it was the second-highest total ever gathered in BC for a referendum effort.

Overgrow Canada campaign 
In 2016 Larsen launched a cannabis seed giveaway campaign called Overgrow Canada. He offered free cannabis seeds by mail and started a 16-city national tour, ultimately claiming to have given away two million seeds that year to over 25,000 people. During the tour he was arrested in Calgary and charged with trafficking because of the seed give-away, spending the night in jail. He continued the tour after the arrest and was not charged or interfered with again.

In 2017, Larsen repeated his national tour and gave away five million seeds to over 50,000 people. During the tour Larsen returned to Calgary to give away more seeds, even though he was still on bail from the first arrest. Police declined to interfere with the second seed giveaway.

In November 2017, Larsen's seed giveaway case went to court and the judge dismissed all charges. Prosecutors dropped initial plans for an appeal.

In 2018 and 2019 Larsen continued the seed giveaway by mail only, and claims to have given away over 10 million cannabis seeds in total. After four years Larsen ended the Overgrow Canada campaign in 2019. There were many instances of cannabis plants growing openly in public places across Canada during the campaign.

420 protest and other activism 
Larsen acted as a spokesperson and organizer for the Vancouver 4/20 Protest Festival for several years, including transitioning the protest from the Vancouver Art Gallery to the larger venue of Sunset Beach Park in 2016. In 2019, the 4/20 festival featured a performance by Cypress Hill. Larsen is the only person to have attended every 4/20 protest from 1996 to 2019.

In July 2013, Larsen travelled to the city of Prince Rupert to mock the local police by presenting them with a "Most Wasted Time Award" trophy for their investigation and raid of a local bong shop.

In June 2015, a spokesperson for Smart Approaches to Marijuana accused Larsen of turning Canada "into a narco-nation."

In September 2017, Larsen testified to the Canadian Parliament's Standing Committee on Health in regards to Bill C-45, the Cannabis Act.

Books and writings 
Larsen was the editor of Cannabis Culture magazine from its creation as "Cannabis Canada" in 1994 until he left the publication in 2005, after producing 54 issues with publisher Marc Emery.

Larsen is the author of The Pot Puzzle Fun Book, released in 2000, the editor of Grow Like a Pro, a marijuana growing guide released in 2004, and the creator of The Tokers Bowl Board Game.

In 2007, Larsen released Hairy Pothead and the Marijuana Stone, a cannabis-laden Harry Potter parody novel which received international media coverage.

In July 2015, Larsen released an illustrated, cannabis-themed Dr Seuss parody book called Green Buds and Hash, which produced some controversy.

In December 2015, Larsen released a book called The Illustrated History of Cannabis in Canada. To promote the book he sent a gram of marijuana and a free copy of the book to every Liberal member of Parliament, including Prime Minister Justin Trudeau. He included a letter wishing the elected officials "A Merry-Juana Christmas and a Hashy New Year."

Larsen's other books include The Pie-Eyed Piper, and most recently Sinbad the Strain Hunter: Voyage to Noweedia.

In 2021, Larsen began writing articles for Cracked.com.

Awards and recognition 
In 2013 and 2017, Vancouver Magazine included Larsen on their list of the city's 50 most powerful people.

In 2017, High Times Magazine recognized Larsen's Overgrow Canada cannabis seed giveaway as one of the "10 Most Memorable Marijuana Stunts" of all time.

In May 2022, Larsen was included on a list of 657 Canadian politicians, businessmen, journalists and activists sanctioned and banned from entering Russia.

External links 
 Dana Larsen's website
 The Medicinal Cannabis Dispensary
 The Medicinal Mushroom Dispensary
 The Coca Leaf Cafe
 Pothead Books
 Get Your Drugs Tested

References

1971 births
Living people
British Columbia candidates for Member of Parliament
British Columbia Marijuana Party politicians
Businesspeople from Vancouver
Canadian humorists
Canadian cannabis activists
Canadian magazine editors
Canadian people of Norwegian descent
Candidates in British Columbia provincial elections
Cannabis political party politicians
Marijuana Party (Canada) candidates for the Canadian House of Commons
New Democratic Party candidates for the Canadian House of Commons
Politicians from Vancouver
Canadian psychedelic drug advocates
Writers from Vancouver